Sammanam is a 1975 Indian Malayalam-language romantic drama film, directed by J. Sasikumar and produced by Thiruppathi Chettiyar. The film stars Prem Nazir, Madhu, Jayabharathi and Sujatha. It is a remake of the 1959 Tamil film Kalyana Parisu.

Plot

Cast 
 Prem Nazir as Bhaskaran
 Madhu as Raghu
 Jayabharathi as Vasanthi
 Sujatha as Geetha

Soundtrack 
The music was composed by V. Dakshinamoorthy, with lyrics by Vayalar Ramavarma.

References

External links 
 

1970s Malayalam-language films
1975 films
1975 romantic drama films
Films directed by J. Sasikumar
Films with screenplays by Thoppil Bhasi
Indian romantic drama films
Malayalam remakes of Tamil films